Id (stylised as ID) is the debut album of the Slovenian rock band Siddharta, released on 27 May 1999. It was named after Sigmund Freud's psychoanalytical theory of personality.

Track listing

Personnel

Siddharta 
 Tomi Meglič — vocals, guitar, back vocals
 Primož Benko — guitar, back vocals
 Boštjan Meglič — drums, back vocals
 Cene Resnik — saxophone, back vocals
 Primož Majerič — bass guitar
 Tomaž Okroglič Rous — keyboards

Additional musicians 
 Anders Kallmark — intro arrangements, keyboards

References

External links 
 Official site

Notes 
1.Only the song "..." is sung in English.

1999 debut albums
Siddharta (band) albums